Sagar Assembly constituency is one of the seats in Karnataka Legislative Assembly in India. It is part of Shimoga Lok Sabha seat.

Members of Legislative Assembly 
Source

Election Results

1967 Assembly Election
 K. H. Sreenivasa (INC) : 11,860 votes    
 Kagodu Thimmappa (SSP) : 11,111

2018 Assembly Election
 Hartalu Halappa (BJP) : 78,475 votes  
 Kagodu Thimmappa (INC) : 70,436 votes

See also 
 List of constituencies of Karnataka Legislative Assembly
Hosanagar Assembly constituency

References 

Assembly constituencies of Karnataka
Shimoga district